Mike O'Cain (born July 20, 1954) is an American football coach and former player.  He was formerly the offensive coordinator and quarterbacks coach for the East Tennessee State University football team. He was the former offensive coordinator for James Madison and served as quarterbacks coach for the Virginia Tech Hokies football team, a position he had held from the 2006 season until the end of the 2012 season.  O'Cain served as the head football coach at North Carolina State University from 1993 to 1999, compiling a record of 41–40.  He played football as a quarterback and punter at Clemson University from 1974 to 1976.

Coaching career
Prior to joining Frank Beamer's staff at Virginia Tech, O'Cain was the offensive coordinator at Clemson University. Under O'Cain, Clemson had ranked nationally among the top offenses in the NCAA. He has also served as an assistant coach at Murray State University, Virginia Tech, East Carolina University, and NC State. He was promoted to the head coaching position at NC State, and compiled a 41–40 record from 1993 to 1999.  While with the Wolfpack, he recruited Philip Rivers, although he did not coach him.

Broadcasting career
Immediately prior to assuming his role at Virginia Tech, O'Cain served as the color commentator for Hokie Playback, a rebroadcast of Virginia Tech's home football games.

Head coaching record

References

External links
 East Tennessee State profile

1954 births
Living people
American football punters
American football quarterbacks
Clemson Tigers football coaches
Clemson Tigers football players
The Citadel Bulldogs football coaches
East Carolina Pirates football coaches
East Tennessee State Buccaneers football coaches
James Madison Dukes football coaches
Murray State Racers football coaches
NC State Wolfpack football coaches
North Carolina Tar Heels football coaches
Virginia Tech Hokies football announcers
Virginia Tech Hokies football coaches
People from Orangeburg, South Carolina